The South of England Championships, also known as the South of England Open Championships,  was an outdoor tennis event held on grass courts at the Devonshire Park Lawn Tennis Club in Eastbourne, United Kingdom from 1881 until 1972.

History
The competition at Eastbourne, even from its early beginnings, was considered one of the most prestigious tournaments that attracted large entries and matches even in those days  and it was the world's largest tournament in terms of participants at the turn of the twentieth century.

Women's tennis

The first tournament to be staged at Devonshire Park was a women's event in 1881, known as the South of England Championships, and  usually held every September. Winners of the lady's singles championships included Dorothea Chambers, Blanche Bingley Hillyard, and Charlotte Cooper Sterry, May Langrishe. The first overseas non  British Isles winner was the American Elizabeth Ryan in collecting 3 consecutive titles (1919–21); after World War One she was followed by the South African  Irene Peacock in 1923 and Anita Lizana from Chile in 1936.

Following World War Two tennis British winners included Ann Haydon and Shirley Bloomer the Brazilian player Maria Bueno the Australian player Fay Toyne was the last foreign ladies champion before the advent of the open era in 1968 the South of England Championships changed schedule to July until 1969 after the Championships at Wimbledon in 1970 its schedule changed again so that it was held before Wimbledon the South of England Championships continued until 1967.

From 1968 until today the tournament has attracted many different sponsors.

In 1968 it was known as the Rothman's Invitational for sponsorship reasons from 1969 to 1972 it was called the Eastbourne Invitational, the event ceased in 1972.

Men's tennis
The first Men’s events started in 1881 also called the South of England Championships early winners of the men's championship included Wilfred Baddeley, Sydney Howard Smith, Josiah Ritchie, Anthony Wilding, Otto Froitzheim and Ken Rosewall it continued until 1967 before being renamed for sponsorship reasons in 1968 from 1970 to 1973 the men's tournament was known as the Rothmans South of England Open Championships. The men's event also ceased in 1973.

Tennis after 1973

In 1974 the Devonshire Park Lawn Tennis club decided on a completely new format tennis tournament and re-branding of tennis at Eastbourne from the outcome of staging the South of England Championships that became known as the Eastbourne International the tournament is still active today.

Past finals
Notes: Challenge round: The final round of a tournament, in which the winner of a single-elimination phase faces the previous year's champion, who plays only that one match. The challenge round was used in the early history of tennis (from 1877 through 1921)  in some tournaments not all. 

Blanche Bingley Hillyard holds the record for the most women's singles titles with 11.

Singles

Women

Men

Statistics

Singles champions by country

Women

Men

References

External links
 Tennisbase,com – South of England Championships men's singles roll of honour

Defunct tennis tournaments in the United Kingdom
Grass court tennis tournaments
Tennis tournaments in England